Cherchez la femme is a French phrase which literally means "look for the woman."

It may also refer to:
 "Cherchez La Femme", song performed by Dr. Buzzard's Original Savannah Band and later by Gloria Estefan
 Last song on Fabulous Poodles eponymous debut
 Some Like It Veiled (Cherchez la femme), French film